The Khagi  are a Hindu caste found mainly in the western region of Uttar Pradesh in India.

Origin 

The word Khagi is said to be derived from the Sanskrit khadgika, which means a swordsman. According to the hcommunity's tradition,they are belong from kshatriya rajput community they were originally chauhans of Ajmer who emigrated under their leaders Kanka and Mahesa, who left their homeland as a result of a famine, and settled in the town of Sahaswan in Badaun District. The Khagi became the local rulers, but fell out with a Sultan of Delhi, who sent a force to suppress them. They suffered defeat, and their estates were confiscated, and they were forced to become cultivators. The community also practiced widow remarriage, a custom not followed by other clans, and as such evolved into a distinct community.

Present circumstances 

The Khagis are strictly endogamous community, and practice clan exogamy. Their main clans are the Tomar,Baiswar, Bais, rusiya, sisoudiya,sikarwar,Chauhan,Bhati,
chandel,kacchwaha Imratpuriya Khadagvanshi,badgujar,Raghuvanshi. Each of these clans is of equal status, and intermarry. The Khagi are a small and medium sized farmers, and tend to occupy their own villages. They are found mainly in Badaun, Moradabad and Jyotiba Phule Nagar in Rohilkhand, and Rampur Sambhal, there are also settlements in Etah and Mainpuri districts. Their customs are similar to other Hindu cultivating castes such d Kisan.

References 

Hindu communities
Khagi community belong from ethnic groups of Maharana Pratap
And All the people of Khagi society use 'Rana' in their sir name.